Alford may refer to:

People
Alford (surname)

Places
Australia
Alford, South Australia

England
Alford, Lincolnshire
Alford Manor House
Alford Windmill
Queen Elizabeth's Grammar School, Alford
Alford, Somerset
Alford Crossways

Scotland
Alford, Aberdeenshire
Alford Valley Railway

United States
Alford, Florida
Alford, Indiana
Alford, Massachusetts

Other uses
Alford plea, in US law
North Carolina v. Alford, the Supreme Court case concerning the Alford plea

See also
Allford (disambiguation)